Mary, Lady Carey (née Jackson, later Peyler) was the author of poems and meditations.

Mary Carey was the daughter of Sir John Jackson. She married Pelham Carey, son of Henry, 4th Lord Hunsdon (whom King James I had created Viscount Rochford on 6 July 1621; he was later created 1st Earl of Dover by King Charles I). She subsequently married George Peyler, although she was always known as Lady Carey.

References

1600s births
1680s deaths
17th-century English women writers
17th-century English writers
Mary
English women poets